Danish Australians are Australians with full or partial Danish ancestry. The majority of these people are part of the Danish diaspora.

History of immigration
There was some Danish immigration at the time of the Australian gold rushes. It was estimated that there were 1,000 Danes on the Victorian goldfields. Danish immigrants had a significant effect on the  Australian dairy industry from the 1880s, in particular establishing and managing butter factories.

Danes in Tasmania 
During the 1870s, a number of East Prussian and Danish Lutherans arrived in Tasmania. Most of them settled in the farming district of Bismarck, attracted by the cheap land and an abundance of clean water. The area was declared a town in 1881.

Lutheranism was very slow to establish in Tasmania. Due to the absence of a Lutheran church, some of the Germans in Bismarck joined the Seventh-day Adventist Church, which arrived in the region in 1889. A Lutheran church was finally opened in Hobart on 11 August 1871 and remains active today but none was ever built in Bismarck.

Post-war migration 
There was little emigration from Denmark to Australia in the first half of the twentieth century: in 1901, Australia had a population of 6,281 people who had been born in Denmark; in 1947, that number had slackened to 2,759. At both counts, the population was approximately 75% male. Danish men married women of other ethnicities in Australia, which made it harder for the community to maintain its identity.

Danish citizens were within the scope of Australia's Post-war immigration scheme.  From a population of 2,954 Danish Australians in 1954, there were 7,911 Danes living in Australia in 1981. Masculinity ratios were healthier, with 58% of these being males.

At the 2006 Census, 8,963 Australian residents declared they were born in Denmark.  In addition, 50,413 Australian residents claimed Danish ancestry, either singularly or with another ancestry.

Culture
There is a Danish Australian Cultural Society. The Australian Danish community has been written about in books.

The danish royal guards have a chapter of their veteransassociation in Australia.

Notable Danish Australians

See also
 
Australia–Denmark relations
Collinsvale, Tasmania
Scandinavian Australians
Anglo-Celtic Australians
Danish diaspora

References

External links
 Danish Australian Cultural Society

Australia
 
European Australian